The "German question" was a debate in the 19th century, especially during the Revolutions of 1848, over the best way to achieve a unification of all or most lands inhabited by Germans. From 1815 to 1866, about 37 independent German-speaking states existed within the German Confederation. The  ("Greater German solution") favored unifying all German-speaking peoples under one state, and was promoted by the Austrian Empire and its supporters. The  ("Little German solution") sought only to unify the northern German states and did not include any part of Austria (either its German-inhabited areas or its areas dominated by other ethnic groups); this proposal was favored by the Kingdom of Prussia.

Both movements were part of a growing German nationalism. They also drew upon similar contemporary efforts to create a unified nation state of people who shared a common ethnicity and language, such as the Unification of Italy by the House of Savoy and the Serbian Revolution.

During the Cold War, the term was repurposed to refer to the matters pertaining to the division, and re-unification, of Germany.

Background 

Over the centuries, the loose German Holy Roman Empire had to cope with a continuous loss of authority to its constituent Imperial States. The disastrous Thirty Years' War proved especially detrimental to the Holy Roman Emperor's authority, as the mightiest two entities within it, the Austrian Habsburg monarchy and Brandenburg-Prussia, evolved into rivalling European absolute powers with territory reaching far beyond Holy Roman Imperial borders. Meanwhile, the many small city-states splintered further. In the 18th century the Holy Roman Empire consisted of over a thousand separate territories governed by distinct authorities.

This rivalry between Austria and Prussia resulted in the War of the Austrian Succession, and then outlasted the French Revolution and Napoleon's domination of Europe. Facing the dissolution of the Holy Roman Empire, the ruling House of Habsburg proclaimed the Austrian Empire in 1804. On August 6, 1806, Habsburg Emperor Francis II had abdicated the throne of the Holy Roman Empire in the course of the Napoleonic Wars with France. The 1815 restoration by the Final Act of the Vienna Congress established the German Confederation, which was not a nation but a commonwealth association of sovereign states on the territory of the former Holy Roman Empire.

While a number of factors swayed allegiances in the debate, the most prominent was religion. The  would have implied a dominant position for Catholic Austria, the largest and most powerful German state of the early 19th century. As a result, Catholics and Austria-friendly, mostly southern states usually favored . A unification of Germany led by Prussia would mean the domination of the new state by the Protestant House of Hohenzollern, a more palatable option to Protestant, mostly northern German states. Another complicating factor was the Austrian Empire's inclusion of a large number of non-Germans, such as Hungarians, Czechs, South Slavs, Italians, Poles, Ruthenians, Romanians and Slovaks. Additional complication was that the Austrians were reluctant to enter a unified Germany if it meant giving up their non-German speaking territories.

March Revolution 

In 1848, German liberals and nationalists united in revolution, forming the Frankfurt Parliament. The Greater German movement within this National Assembly demanded the unification of all German-populated lands into one nation.

Those supporting the  position argued that since the Habsburgs had ruled the Holy Roman Empire for almost 400 years from 1440 to 1806 (the only break coming from the extinction of the Habsburg male line in 1740 to the election of Francis I in 1745), Austria was best suited to lead the unified nation. However, Austria posed a problem because the Habsburgs ruled large chunks of non-German-speaking territory. The largest such area was the Kingdom of Hungary, which also included large Slovak, Romanian and Croat populations. Austria further comprised numerous possessions with predominantly non-German populations, including Czechs in the Bohemian lands, Poles, Rusyns and Ukrainians in the Galician province, Slovenes in Carniola, and Italians in Lombardy–Venetia and Trento, which was still incorporated into the Tyrolean crown land, altogether making up the larger part of the Austrian Empire. Except for Bohemia, Carniola, and Trento, these territories were not part of the German Confederation because they had not (in some cases not lately) been part of the former Holy Roman Empire, and none of them desired to be included in a German nation-state. The Czech politician  explicitly rejected the offered mandate to the Frankfurt assembly, stating that the Slavic lands of the Habsburg Empire were not a subject of German debates. On the other hand, for Austrian prime minister Prince Felix of Schwarzenberg, only the accession of the Habsburg Empire as a whole was acceptable because it had no intention to part from its non-German possessions and dismantle in order to remain in an all-German Empire.

They argued that Prussia, as the only Great Power with a predominantly German-speaking population, was best qualified to lead the newly unified Germany. Yet, the drafted constitution provided for the possibility for Austria to join without its non-German possessions later. On March 30, 1849, the Frankfurt parliament offered the German Imperial crown to King Frederick William IV of Prussia, who rejected it. The revolution failed and several subsequent attempts by Prince Schwarzenberg to build up a German federation headed by Austria came to nothing.

Austro-Prussian War and Franco-Prussian War 

These efforts were finally terminated by Austria's humiliating defeat in 1866 Austro-Prussian War. After the Peace of Prague, the Prussian chancellor , now at the helm of German politics, pursued the expulsion of Austria and managed to unite all German states except Austria under Prussian leadership, while the Habsburg lands were shaken by ethnic nationalist conflicts, only superficially resolved with the Austro-Hungarian Compromise of 1867.

At the same time, Bismarck established the North German Confederation, seeking to prevent the Austrian and Bavarian Catholics in the south from being a predominant force in a mainly Protestant Prussian Germany. He successfully used the Franco-Prussian War to convince the other German states, including the Kingdom of Bavaria, to stand with Prussia against the Second French Empire; Austria-Hungary did not participate in the war. Bismarck used the prestige gained from the victory to maintain the alliance with Bavaria and proclaimed the German Empire. Protestant Prussia became the dominant power of the new state, and Austria-Hungary was excluded, remaining a separate polity. The Little German solution prevailed.

Later influence 

The idea of Austrian territories with a significant German-speaking population joining a Greater German state was maintained by some circles both in Austria-Hungary and Germany. It was again promoted after the close of World War I and the dissolution of the Austro–Hungarian monarchy in 1918 by the proclamation of the rump state, German Austria. Proponents attempted to incorporate German Austria into the German Weimar Republic.

In 1931, there was an attempt to create a customs union between the Weimar Republic and Austria. The move was protested by France, and bankers such as Henry Strakosch of Austria, who later became a financier of Winston Churchill. Large-volume money transfers followed, making the customs union impractical as the economic crisis deepened.

In Germany, Adolf Hitler, an Austrian German by birth, had been a firm proponent of the unification of Germany and Austria.  A demand for a Greater Germany was included in a 1920 party platform of the Nazi Party. Hitler's election in Germany set into motion increased pressure for a merger between Germany and Austria that swayed many Austrian politicians. But fascist Italy, despite its friendly relations with Hitler, strongly opposed any kind of merger of Austria into Germany, and pressured and threatened Austrian politicians from pursuing such a course. Austria, meanwhile, adopted Austrofascism which focused on the history of Austria and opposed the absorption of Austria into Nazi Germany (according to the belief that Austrians were "better Germans").  Austrian Chancellor  (1934–1938) called Austria the "better German state". Nevertheless, German nationalists' desire for a unified nation-state incorporating all Germans into a Greater Germany persisted and, in time, Mussolini's Italy became distracted by its 1936 invasion of Ethiopia, leading to a stretch of resources and less willingness to intervene in Austria.

In 1938, Hitler's long-desired union between his birthplace, Austria, and Germany was completed, which violated the terms of the Treaty of Versailles; the League of Nations was unable to enforce the ban on such a union. The Anschluss was met with overwhelming approval of the German-Austrian people, and was confirmed by a referendum shortly after. The unification process was reinforced one month later by a referendum, supported by an overwhelming majority. In contrast to the political situation in the 19th century, when Austria had controlled large areas of non-German peoples, Austria became the subordinate partner in the new unified German-speaking state. From 1938 to 1942, the former state of Austria was referred to as Ostmark ("Eastern March") by the new German state. The names were informal at first, but the change to  became official in 1943. As well as Germany (pre-World War II borders), Austria, and Alsace-Lorraine, the  included the Grand Duchy of Luxembourg, Sudetenland, Bohemia and Moravia, the Memel Territory, the Polish areas annexed by Nazi Germany, the Free State of Danzig, and the "General Government" territories (territories of Poland under German military occupation).

East and West Germany and reunification 

This unification lasted only until the end of World War II. With the defeat of the Nazi regime in 1945, "Greater Germany" was separated into West Germany, East Germany, and Austria by the Allied Powers. Austria was also occupied but given full sovereignty by the 1955 Austrian State Treaty which among other things required Austria to renounce any designs on uniting with Germany. Austrian neutrality was affirmed in a separate but related act. Furthermore, Germany was stripped of much of historic eastern Germany (i.e. the bulk of Prussia), most of which was annexed to Poland, with a small portion annexed to the Soviet Union (today's Kaliningrad Oblast). Luxembourg, the Czech (via Czechoslovakia), and the Slovenian lands (via Yugoslavia) regained their independence from German control. Germans in Eastern Europe were also expelled after the war.

The German question was a central aspect of the origins of the Cold War. The legal and diplomatic intercourse between the Allies regarding the treatment of the German question brought forward the elements of intervention and coexistence which formed the basis for a relatively peaceful postwar international order. The division of Germany started with the creation of four occupation zones, continued with establishing two German states (West Germany and East Germany), was deepened in the period of Cold War with the Berlin Wall from 1961 and existed until 1989/1990. After the Uprising of 1953 in East Germany, the official holiday in the Federal Republic of Germany was set on 17 June and was named "Day of German Unity", in order to remind all Germans of the “open” (unanswered) German Question, which meant the call for reunification.

Because of the idea's association with Nazism and rise of Austrian national identity, there are no mainstream political groups in Austria or Germany that advocate a "Greater Germany" today; those that do are often regarded as fascist and/or neo-Nazis.

See also 

 Inner German border
 Legal status of Germany
 German nationalism in Austria

References

External links 

 Maps of German and European revolutions of 1848-49 and German unification (omniatlas.com)

Question
19th century in Prussia
19th century in the Habsburg monarchy
German irredentism
National questions
Question
Political movements